Dalglish Papin Test (born 3 May 1991) is a midfielder for Sarawak FA in Malaysia Premier League.

References

External links
 

1991 births
Living people
Malaysian footballers
Sarawak FA players
Malaysia Super League players
Association football midfielders